John Palmer (January 29, 1785 – December 8, 1840) was an American lawyer and politician who served as a member of the United States House of Representatives from New York from 1817 to 1819.

Biography 
He was born in Hoosick, Rensselaer County, New York. After completing preparatory studies, he graduated from Williams College in Williamstown, Massachusetts, studied law, and was admitted to the bar. He then commenced practice in Plattsburgh, New York in 1810. Palmer also served as paymaster in the Eighth Regiment of the New York Militia during the War of 1812.

Congress 
Palmer was elected to Congress as a Democratic-Republican to the fifteenth Congress (March 4, 1817 – March 3, 1819).

Later career 
After leaving Congress, he was a district attorney until 1832. For part of the year 1832, he was a member of the New York State Assembly, after which he served as judge of Clinton County until 1837, when he resigned. He was elected as a Democrat to the twenty-fifth Congress (March 4, 1837 – March 3, 1839), after which he did not run for reelection.

Death 
Palmer died in St. Bartholomew in the French West Indies at the age of 55.  He was buried at Saint Bartholomews Cemetery in Gustavia, Saint Barthélemy.  There is a cenotaph to his memory at Riverside Cemetery in Plattsburgh.

John Palmer was the uncle of George William Palmer, also a U.S. Representative from New York.

References

1785 births
1840 deaths
American militia officers
American militiamen in the War of 1812
New York (state) state court judges
Williams College alumni
New York (state) Democratic-Republicans
Democratic-Republican Party members of the United States House of Representatives
Democratic Party members of the United States House of Representatives from New York (state)
People from Hoosick, New York
Politicians from Plattsburgh, New York
People from Clinton County, New York
19th-century American politicians
19th-century American judges